Spectacular Bid (February 17, 1976 – June 9, 2003) was a champion American Thoroughbred racehorse who won the 1979 Kentucky Derby and Preakness Stakes and holds the world record for the fastest 1 1/4 miles on the dirt. He won 26 of his 30 races and earned a then-record $2,781,607. He also won Eclipse Awards in each of his three racing seasons.

Spectacular Bid was the leading American two-year-old of 1978, winning the Champagne Stakes and the Laurel Futurity. As a three-year-old, he won the Kentucky Derby and the Preakness Stakes, giving him twelve consecutive victories. Spectacular Bid then tried to become the third consecutive Triple Crown winner, but he only came third in the Belmont Stakes after hurting his foot before the race. He recovered from the injury to win the Marlboro Cup and confirm his status as the best American colt of his generation. In 1980 as a four-year-old, Spectacular Bid was undefeated in nine races, and was named American Horse of the Year. During his career, he broke several track records as well as the world record for 1 1/4 miles on the dirt.

Background
Spectacular Bid was bred at Buck Pond Farm near Lexington, Kentucky by Madelyn Jason and her mother, Mrs. William Gilmore. He was a very dark gray (described as "steel-gray" and "battleship-colored") during his racing career although, like all grays, his coat lightened as he aged, and he eventually took on a "flea-bitten gray" appearance.

His sire was Bold Bidder, stakes winner of 13 races who also sired the 1974 Kentucky Derby winner, Cannonade. His grandsire was Bold Ruler, a U.S. Racing Hall of Fame inductee and an eight-time Leading sire in North America. His dam was the gray mare Spectacular by Promised Land, who, as a descendant of the broodmare Fly By Night, was a member of the same branch of Thoroughbred Family 2-d which also produced the Kentucky Derby winners Northern Dancer and Cannonade. Spectacular Bid was inbred 3x3 to the stallion To Market, meaning that this horse appears twice in the third generation of his pedigree. As of 2012 he remains one of the two most inbred Kentucky Derby winners in the last 50 years (Big Brown was similarly inbred to Northern Dancer).

As a yearling, Spectacular Bid was sold at auction for US$37,000 (equivalent to $ in ) at the 1977 Keeneland September yearling sale to Harry and Teresa Meyerhoff of Hawksworth Farm, on the Eastern Shore of Maryland. The colt was sent into training with Grover G. "Bud" Delp, who remained his trainer throughout his career.

Racing record

1978: two-year-old season

Spectacular Bid began his racing career on June 30, 1978, at Pimlico Race Course, where he came within  of a second of the track record for  furlongs. Three weeks later at his next start at Pimlico, an allowance race, he equalled the track record of 1:04.2. He notched stakes victories in the Grade III World's Playground Stakes, the Grade I Champagne Stakes, the Young America Stakes, the Grade I Laurel Futurity (in which he set a track record, a rarity for a two-year-old in a route race, running 1 miles in 1:41.6), and the Heritage Stakes. He also finished second in the Dover Stakes and had his only out-of-the-money finish in the Tyro Stakes. Spectacular Bid's regular jockey was the teenager Ronnie Franklin.

By the end of his first year of racing, Spectacular Bid had won seven races in nine starts, set one track record and tied another, won US$384,484 and been unanimously voted the Eclipse champion two-year-old colt for the year.

1979: three-year-old season

Preparing for the Triple Crown

Spectacular Bid's second year of racing began where his first left off, as he reeled off five wins in rapid succession: the Hutcheson Stakes, the Fountain of Youth, the Florida Derby (all at Gulfstream Park), the Flamingo Stakes (at Hialeah), and the Blue Grass Stakes (at Keeneland Race Course). After the Florida Derby, which Spectacular Bid won by 4½ lengths despite meeting trouble in running, Delp reprimanded Franklin in public over his ride: "You idiot! You nearly killed that horse!". Franklin defended himself by claiming that the other riders had colluded to stop Spectacular Bid obtaining a clear run.

Triple Crown attempt

Spectacular Bid's attempt at the Triple Crown began with the Kentucky Derby at Churchill Downs in May 1979. The crowd of 125,000 made him the 3/5 favorite, with California champion Flying Paster the bettors' second choice. Spectacular Bid seemed nervous before the start, but Delp was so confident of victory that as the horse paraded in front of the fans, he called, "Go bet! Go bet!" Spectacular Bid was restrained by Franklin in the early stages before moving up on the outside to take the lead on the far turn. He drew clear in the straight and won by 2¾ lengths over General Assembly, with Golden Act in third. After suffering a leg cut during the race, Flying Paster finished fifth. Spectacular Bid was the last two-year-old champion to win the Kentucky Derby until Street Sense in 2007.

Spectacular Bid's next step in the quest for the Triple Crown came at the Preakness Stakes at Pimlico. Bumped early, he ran wide and by the final stretch was in command. He handily won the race, outpacing his competitors to win by 5½ lengths from Golden Act, with nine lengths back to Screen King in third. His time of 1:54.2 was faster than that of Seattle Slew or Affirmed, and by official time faster than Secretariat (though Secretariat's time in this race was disputed and in 2012 changed to 1:53.0). When asked about the colt's prospects of winning the Triple Crown in the Belmont Stakes, Franklin claimed that "we're a cinch."

On the morning of the Belmont Stakes, a freak accident was discovered: Spectacular Bid had stepped on a safety pin. The pin had become embedded in his hoof, later leading to an infection that required the hoof to be drilled to cure the problem. However, after the discovery of the injury, Spectacular Bid did not seem lame and was entered into the race. Three days prior to the race, Franklin was fined after he engaged in a fist fight with Ángel Cordero Jr. in the jockeys' preparation room due to a dispute over an earlier race at Belmont.  In the Belmont, Franklin rode Spectacular Bid aggressively early in the mile and a half race and went to the lead before half way. Spectacular Bid held a clear lead entering the stretch but began to struggle and was overtaken by Coastal, who challenged along the inside rail. The favorite faded in the closing stages and lost second place to Golden Act near the finish. Some commentators speculated that Delp and Franklin had been intent on emulating Secretariat's performance in 1973 and that their tactics were intended to maximize the margin of victory. Delp, who had commented dismissively on Coastal's chances before the race, offered few excuses: "[Spectacular Bid] may not be a mile-and-a-half horse. The best horse won. I got beat, that's all. Tomorrow's another day." Franklin, who was replaced by Bill Shoemaker in Spectacular Bid's subsequent races, admitted that he had ridden a poorly judged race, explaining that he had very little experience of race-riding over long distances.

Spectacular Bid's failure to win the Belmont began a record-breaking drought: after Affirmed in 1978, no horse would complete the Triple Crown until American Pharoah achieved the feat in 2015. Spectacular Bid and American Pharoah are also the last two 2-year-old champions to run in the Belmont with Triple Crowns on the line.

Post-triple crown racing

Following the Belmont Stakes, Spectacular Bid took two months off to recover from the injury. He returned to racing with Hall of Fame jockey Bill Shoemaker, who rode him through most of the remainder of his career. His first race back was in August 1979 in an allowance race at Delaware Park. He won by more than 17 lengths and set a new track record for 1 miles, 1:41.6. Spectacular Bid followed this performance with a win at the Marlboro Cup at Belmont Park, beating both horses he had lost to in the Belmont Stakes: Coastal and Golden Act. He was scheduled to race in the Marlboro against 1978 Triple Crown winner Affirmed, but Affirmed's owners bowed out of the race in reaction to a 133-pound impost assignment to Affirmed.

Spectacular Bid did meet Affirmed in the Jockey Club Gold Cup at Belmont in October, where he made repeated challenges and finished second to the Triple Crown winner. This was the last race Spectacular Bid lost, and the only time, apart from the Belmont, in which he raced over a mile and a half. He finished the year with one more race, the Meadowlands Cup, again setting a track record at 1 miles, 2:01.2. At the end of the year, he was unanimously awarded the title of Eclipse champion three-year-old colt for the year and was runner-up to Affirmed in the vote for Horse of the Year. His winnings for this year totalled US$1,279,333.

1980: four-year-old season

As a four-year-old, Spectacular Bid started in nine races, winning them all for earnings of US$1,117,790. He set five track records at distances of 7 furlongs, 1 mile, 1¼ miles, and twice at 1⅛ miles.

His first three races were part of the "Strub Series", all held at the Santa Anita Park course that the late Charles H. Strub owned and built. Spectacular Bid carried 126 pounds in each race and defeated Flying Paster each time. The first race in the series was the Grade II Malibu Stakes at 7 furlong. Spectacular Bid ran the distance in 1:20, which stood as a track record for 27 years until Santa Anita removed its dirt track in favor of an artificial surface. Then he won the Grade II San Fernando Stakes, and finally, he won the Grade I Strub Stakes at 1¼ miles, running the fastest 1¼ miles ever on a dirt track, 1:57.8, and breaking a 30-year-old record of 1:58.2 set by Hall of Famer Noor carrying under 130 pounds in 1950. As of 2020, Spectacular Bid's time still stands as the world record on a dirt track.

Spectacular Bid also won the Grade I Santa Anita Handicap (carrying 130 lbs) on a sloppy track March 2. Then he moved to Hollywood Park Racetrack, where he won the Mervyn Leroy Handicap carrying 132 lbs on May 18 and the Grade I Californian Stakes, carrying 130 lbs in a track record time of 1:45.8. He then shipped to Arlington Park to win the Grade III Washington Park Handicap by ten lengths under 130 lbs. His time of 1:46.2 for 1⅛ miles broke the track record, which had been jointly held by Damascus. Then it was on to Monmouth Park for the Grade I Monmouth Handicap, which he won under 132 lbs, defeating champion filly Glorious Song. Delp caused some controversy by withdrawing Spectacular Bid from the Marlboro Cup after the horse was assigned a weight of 136 lbs.

Spectacular Bid concluded his career with a walkover in the Woodward Stakes on September 20, 1980, at Belmont, covering the 1¼ miles in 2:02.4. A plan to race in the Jockey Club Gold Cup was aborted on the day of the race when an injury to the horse's left front ankle flared up. Delp thereafter announced Spectacular Bid's retirement.

During his final year, Spectacular Bid compiled then-record earnings of US$2,781,607 and was named American Champion Older Male Horse and Horse of the Year. In the voting for the latter award, he received 181 of the 200 votes, beating Genuine Risk (14 votes), Temperence Hill (4) and John Henry (1). His full race record is listed below.

Stud record
Following his last race, Spectacular Bid was syndicated for a then-record US$22 million and put to stud at Claiborne Farm in Kentucky, where his initial stud fee was US$150,000.  He made a promising start to his breeding career, but his later record was disappointing. The quality of mares he attracted fell, and his stud fees declined over the years. He was eventually sold and moved in 1991 to Milfer Farms in Unadilla, New York, where he lived out the remainder of his years, continuing to attract visits and letters from admirers. He was never pensioned from stud duty, covering ten mares at a fee of $3,500 in the last year of his life.

Spectacular Bid was sent to stud at Claiborne Farm, which is where Secretariat was also sent to stud.  Secretariat's paddock at Claiborne Farm bordered three other stallions: Drone, Sir Ivor, and Spectacular Bid.  Secretariat did not pay much attention to Drone or Sir Ivor, but he and Spectacular Bid became friendly and occasionally raced each other along the fence line between their paddocks.

Spectacular Bid sired 253 winners, including 47 stakes winners that won more than US$19 million. His most notable progeny include: Bite the Bullet (19 starts 5-4-2 for US$216,809; sire of 19 SW in Australia), Spectacular Love (won G1 Belmont Futurity Stakes), Spectacular Sue, Maison Close, Lay Down, Festivity, Spectacular Joke, Princess Pietrina, Lotus Pool, Esprit d'Etoile, Legal Bid and Sweettuc. At the time of his death, his daughters had produced 69 stakes winners, including the European Champion Sprinter Mozart.

Spectacular Bid died from a heart attack on June 9, 2003, and was buried at Milfer Farms. At the time of his death, he was the oldest living winner of the Kentucky Derby and the Preakness Stakes.

Honors
The Blood-Horse magazine ranked Spectacular Bid at #10 in the Top 100 U.S. Thoroughbred champions of the 20th Century. He was inducted into the National Museum of Racing and Hall of Fame in 1982. In their book A Century of Champions, based on the Timeform rating system, John Randall and Tony Morris ranked him as the third best North American horse of the 20th century (behind Secretariat and Citation) and the ninth best in their global ranking.

The Los Angeles Times quoted jockey Bill Shoemaker as saying that Spectacular Bid was the best horse he ever rode.

Pedigree

Spectacular Bid was inbred 3 × 3 to To Market, meaning that this stallion appears twice in the third generation of his pedigree.

See also
 List of leading Thoroughbred racehorses
 List of historical horses
 Spectacular Bid- The Eastern Shore Horse

References

1976 racehorse births
2003 racehorse deaths
Racehorses trained in the United States
Racehorses bred in Kentucky
United States Thoroughbred Racing Hall of Fame inductees
Kentucky Derby winners
Preakness Stakes winners
Eclipse Award winners
American Thoroughbred Horse of the Year
American Grade 1 Stakes winners
Thoroughbred family 2-d
Horse racing track record setters